Charmian Hussey (born 1939) is an author of children's literature. Her book The Valley of Secrets is a best seller in many countries.

Biography
According to her website, Hussey was born in London in 1939.  She pursued a career as a model, then decided to obtain her college education.  She studied archeology at the University of London, then at Oxford she completed a doctorate in Turkish pottery. She currently lives in the Cornish countryside with husband John.

Published works
The Valley of Secrets (2003)
Howl On The Wind (Summer 2011)

References

External links 
 Home page

English children's writers
Living people
1939 births